World at Your Feet (球在你脚下) is a Singapore MediaCorp Channel 8 television series produced in 2014, which premiered on 14 May 2014. It stars Ha Yu, Tay Ping Hui, Jeanette Aw, Elvin Ng, Zhang Zhenhuan and Yvonne Lim as the main casts of the series. The show aired at 9pm on weekdays. It revolves around the theme of football, as a lead-up to the 2014 FIFA World Cup held at Brazil.

Plot
Mei Renxin (Ha Yu) is a weirdo who is withdrawn. He does not get along well with people and is very unapproachable.

Renxin’s anti-social behaviour is a result of an incident some years ago. His wife fainted on the road but nobody went to her aid. She died tragically and in bitterness after missing the window period to revive her.

Renxin was a celebrated football coach well known for his game strategies back then. However, the sudden death of his wife caused him much guilt. He could not forgive himself for neglecting and shortchanging her. Thereafter, he sank into oblivion and kept a distance from the sports arena.

The Mei family lives next door to the Mo family. The two families are separated by a thin wall.

The two neighbours are on bad terms as Renxin is unapproachable. He had several brushes with Mo Lihua (Vivian Lai), the second sister in the Mo family, over some petty matters. It came to the point where their neighbourly ties were soured. The feuding resulted in the enmity between the Mei and Mo families.

In his youth, Hong Canghai (Tay Ping Hui) was high-spirited and a name to be reckoned with in football.
His tricky “random kick” was a delight to watch. His forte was the penalty kick where he could send the ball to any point and even kick it straight into the goal. As his wife Zheng Yongyi (Yvonne Lim) cannot get along with his mother, Canghai has no choice but to move out. This leads to his younger brother, Hong Dehai (Ian Fang), resenting him for abandoning their mother over a woman. They became estranged. Canghai has always been someone who values friendship. He never turns down anyone’s request to borrow money from him. As a result of that, his wife is very unhappy with him. Seeing that he has achieved nothing, his career-minded wife decides to leave him. The couple have two sons, Hong Qian Feng (Ivan Lo Kai Jun) and Hong Houwei (Tan Jun Sheng), aged 11 and 10 respectively. After the separation, Yongyi gains custody of the two children. Canghai and his children are miserable over their situation. Canghai refuses to give up. He will do anything to bring his broken family back together again.

Wu Weixiong (Elvin Ng), a professional footballer, falls in love with Mo Yuqing (Jeanette Aw) at first sight. However, because Weixiong has an eye disease, he carries on an ambiguous relationship with Yuqing. Later, his role in an assault case discourages him from accepting Yuqing’s love as he has made up his mind to turn himself in. However, Yuqing is adamant that Weixiong is avoiding her for reasons he will not disclose. In the end, he is forced to hit Yuqing to drive her away.

Ever since Lihua met Canghai, she is captivated by his manliness, and love for his children. She rents a room to Canghai in the hope of capturing his heart. Unfortunately for her, Canghai rejects her love as he still loves his wife.

After his release from jail, Weixiong’s eye disease worsens and he avoids people by living on his own. One day, Yuqing chances to meet Weixiong, who is a guide of “Dialogue in Darkness” Experiential Walk. She finds out the truth and decides to help Weixiong brace up and make a comeback. But Yuqing, who has accepted Gao Guotian’s (Zhang Zhenhuan) love, is in a dilemma now.

Although Guotian is a gifted footballer, he faces objections from Gao Shou (Zheng Geping) over a football career. Gao Shou is his paternal uncle who has raised him.

Guotian and Weixiong are good friends. One day, both of them got into a drunken stupor. Guotian injured someone in his bid to save him. To protect himself, he bribes the witness, Ann (Silver Ang), to frame the miserable Weixiong. Weixiong, who is in the dark, chooses to turn himself in. Guotian pleads with him against doing so, yet is afraid to tell him the truth. He feels distressed.

Guotian is in love with Yuqing and stands by her. His constant encouragement and assistance finally moves Yuqing into accepting his love. However, Guotian is perfectly aware that their relationship rests on a time bomb that will go off anytime…

Gao Shou, too, was a professional footballer when he was young. He gave up his dream for the sake of his career, and became a successful businessman. Ye Laixiang (Aileen Tan) was a waitress but worked very hard to get close to Gao Shou to become his assistant. Although she knows that he is married with Qifang (Chen Huihui), she continues to have feelings for him. It leads to a hopeless relationship with no end in sight, but gives a boost to her relationship with Renxin.

Mo Shijing (Brandon Wong), the eldest son of the Mo family, has incredible arm strength. Unfortunately, he is a bum addicted to gambling.  He and Lan Yangyang (Dennis Chew), Renxin’s brother-in-law, are colleagues in a warehouse. In his youth, he fathered an illegitimate son, Liao Huancong (Xu Bin), without knowing it. He thought that the other party, Xiuhe, had the child with another man. It was only after Xiuhe revealed the truth on her deathbed that he came to his senses. Henceforth, he turned over a new leaf for Huancong.
 
Yangyang is Renxin’s brother-in-law. He is languid by nature and does everything by foot instead of using his hands. This turns out to be a boon because it actually trains him to develop a set of skills using his feet. Yangyang, a former columnist, is a man of emotions. He falls for Yuqing but after being spurned by her, turns his attention to her elder sister, Lihua, creating some funny episodes in the process.

Wang Jiannan (Douglas Kung) is the teammate of Canghai, Weixiong and Guotian. He requires a huge sum of money for medical treatment for his younger sister who is suffering from a serious illness.

This bunch of desperate people with a common passion for football decide to participate in a street football tournament that comes with a generous prize. But they are thrashed soundly in their first match. At the critical juncture, Renxin finally shows his prowess. Only then does everyone know that he is someone to be reckoned with. Thereafter, under Renxin’s coaching, the team surprisingly scores a victory and goes on to win match after match.

Meanwhile, Dehai, Huancong, Fang Yangming (Aloysius Pang) and a few other young men form “Peaks Team” so that Renxin’s “Fire Team” cannot steal the limelight. This group of boys whose future seems uncertain are not exactly enthusiastic initially about participating in the tournament. Later, with encouragement from Yangming, who is afflicted with an incurable illness, they decide to take the tournament seriously in order to score a personal triumph as the boys feel that they have never won any prizes in their lives before.

And so the battle begins. The “Fire Team” of men past their prime and the “Peaks Team” of young men vie for the trophy. The two teams start out as rivals who are uncompromising but end up as friends who appreciate one other. The situation is certainly one of “The ball is in your court” and “Life is how you deal with it”. Faced with a common enemy subsequently, the Mei and Mo families discard their animosity to join hands in forming the “Brave Lions Team” to defeat the mighty Hong Kong team.

Renxin is the captain of the Singapore team. Whether this group of people will turn their lives around and make a comeback or not, one can only hear him shouting fervently on the sideline: “Don’t give up! The world is at your feet!”

Cast

Main cast

Mei (Renxin) family

Mo (Lihua) family

Hong (Canghai) extended family

Wu (Weixiong) family

Gao (Shou) family

Ye (Laixiang) family

Fire Team

Peaks Team

Other cast

Special appearances

Awards and nominations
World at Your Feet garnered 13 nominations for 10 awards in Star Awards 2015, winning 2 of them.

Star Awards 2015

Trivia 
 This is the second series after It Takes Two to use Korean songs, though they are not the official themes.
 It is Ha Yu's third Singaporean drama series after Love Thy Neighbour and It's a Wonderful Life. Ha Yu and Brandon Wong are the only two cast members to have appeared in the three series so far. Vivian Lai, Douglas Kung, Ha Yu, Aileen Tan, Tan Junsheng and Brandon Wong acted in the series as well.
 This is the second time Brandon Wong and Xu Bin have acted as father and son in a drama, after Don't Stop Believin' in 2012. Both dramas were written by Lau Ching Poon.
 Vivian Lai's 2014 series after Love Thy Neighbour.
 Due to Elvin Ng's role in C.L.I.F. 3, he will only appear in some episodes in the series.
 The names of some of the characters are homonyms to Chinese phrases, e.g. 梅仁信 sounding like 没人性 or 没人信, 吴伟雄 sounding like 无尾熊, 莫丽花 sounding like 茉莉花, 蓝阳阳 sounding like 懒洋洋, 叶来香 sounding like 夜来香, 高首 sounding like 高手. In addition, there are also name combinations, 李道强 and 李思蔷 sounding like 李思蔷(思念道强), 高过天 and 莫雨晴 sounding like 雨过天晴.
 Snippets of the next episode are shown during the ending credits of each episode. This is the sixth series where News Tonight commentaries are not announced.
 A spin-off telemovie titled Unexpected Strangers (小心陌生人) was later produced whereby only Jeanette Aw, Elvin Ng, Zhang Zhenhuan and Richard Low reprised their roles, and was joined by new cast members Jayley Woo and Allen Chen.
 The show, along with the line "We're brothers. I will give you support when you need it most. (我们是brother麻。在你最需要support的时候呢，给你support！)" said by Dennis Chew, are mentioned in episode 36 of 118, which also starred Chew and Xu Bin.
 This is the first known series in which a Cabinet Minister (the Minister for Culture, Community and Youth or MCCY) has made a cameo appearance in a Channel 8 drama serial. The actual MCCY is in charge of overseeing the development of sports in Singapore, through a statuary board known as Sport Singapore. The next series in which cabinet ministers would make special appearances would be Eat Already?, in which the Minister of State for Communications and Information as well as the Parliamentary Secretary for Education made cameo appearances in separate scenes helping to explain government policies to the people of Singapore.
 This series was repeated on weekends at 4.30pm - 6.30pm after succeeding The Dream Makers.
This series repeat on Sundays starting 11 Jul 2021 at 12.30am after succeeding Table of Glory.

See also
 List of World at Your Feet episodes
List of MediaCorp Channel 8 Chinese drama series (2010s)

References

Singapore Chinese dramas
2014 Singaporean television series debuts
2014 Singaporean television series endings
Channel 8 (Singapore) original programming
Channel U (Singapore) original programming